A tamale, in Spanish tamal, is a traditional Mesoamerican dish made of masa, a dough made from nixtamalized corn, which is steamed in a corn husk or banana leaf. The wrapping can either be discarded prior to eating or used as a plate. Tamales can be filled with meats, cheeses, fruits, vegetables, herbs, chilies, or any preparation according to taste, and both the filling and the cooking liquid may be seasoned.

Tamale is an anglicized version of the Spanish word .  comes from the Nahuatl .

Origin 
Tamales originated in Mesoamerica as early as 8000 to 5000 BC.

The preparation of tamales is likely to have spread from the indigenous cultures in Guatemala and Mexico to the rest of Latin America. According to archaeologists Karl Taube, William Saturno, and David Stuart, tamales may date from around 100 AD. They found pictorial references in the Mural of San Bartolo, in Petén, Guatemala.

The Aztec and Maya civilizations, as well as the Olmec and Toltec before them, used tamales as easily portable food, for hunting trips, and for traveling large distances, as well as supporting their armies. Tamales were also considered sacred, as they were seen as the food of the gods. The Aztec, Maya, Olmecs, and Toltecs all considered themselves to be people of corn, so tamales played a large part in their rituals and festivals.

Mesoamerica

Aztec 
Thanks to the expansive Florentine Codex written by Reverend Bernardino de Sahagún, the different forms of Tamales eaten and sold in Aztec markets is well documented. In book X he describes Aztec tamales used a variety of corn for their flour base and were cooked in earth ovens, or olla, which were heated by the steam of dried cane grown and harvested for the expressed purpose of cooking tamales. Fillings would consist of meat (turkey, fish, frog, axolotl, gopher), fruit, bean, squash seed, turkey egg and even no filling. They would be seasoned with chilis or seeds if they were savory and honey if they were sweet.

Tamales also held great religious and spiritual importance within Aztec culture. It was customary for Aztec women to stay up for two to three days cooking tamales before a wedding. (Codex, Book IX). In terms of festivities, the most notable was Uauhquiltamalcualiztli, which was celebrated during the 18th month ,of the calendar round. The name of the celebration translates to 'The Eating of Tamales Stuffed with Amaranth Greens' and was a celebration of the fire deity Ixcozauhqui. Another significant rituals for the Aztecs was the feast of Atamalcualiztli (eating of water tamales). This ritual, held every eight years for a whole week, was done by eating tamales without any seasoning, spices, or filling, which allowed the maize freedom from being overworked in the usual tamale cooking methods.

Maya (Pre-Colombian) 
In the present day, it is common in certain Maya areas, to steam tamales in a spherical vessel known as a tamalero, as opposed to boiling them, this practice has been linked back to the Classic Maya period due to the presence of boiler scale in Classic Maya pottery. The other common method of cooking tamales was on a comal which is a large flat stone, this method is also used to cook tortillas. In addition to the leaves of plantain and banana which are commonly used today, Mayan tamales were commonly wrapped in the leaves of avocado or piper plants, which would be gathered by men during the rainy season. While meat and fish were the customary fillings of tamales of this era, squash seeds and flowers, and greens such as chaya, or chipilin were also common. Fray Diego de Landa Calderón also spoke of 'special breads' [tamales] which were used specifically as offerings, with fillings such as deer heart, or quail. Because of the convenience offered by tamales, specific tamales were made for hunters and travelers. These tamales were cooked with extra wood ashes in order to create a hard 'shell' around the tamales when dried, this allowed tamales to keep for up to 20 days.

Tamales appear often in ceramic ware from the Mayan Classic era (200-1000 c.e). The Fenton vase shows a plate of unwrapped tamales being offered as a penance to a powerful Mayan nobleman.

Toltec 
While the exact origin of tamales has yet to be determined, the oldest people confirmed to have eaten them were the Toltecs, as archaeologists have found fossilized corn husks around the Pyramids of the Sun and Moon in Teotihuacan. (c. 250 b.c - 750)

Caribbean

Cuba
In Cuba, before the 1959 Revolution, street vendors sold Mexican-style tamales wrapped in corn husks, usually made without any kind of spicy seasoning. Cuban tamales being identical in form to those made in Mexico City suggests they were brought over to Cuba during the period of intense cultural and musical exchange between Cuba and Mexico after the 1920s.

A well-known Cuban song from the 1950s, "", (a cha-cha-cha sung by Orquesta Aragón) celebrated the delicious tamales sold by a street vendor in Cienfuegos.

Dominican Republic
In the Dominican Republic,  are Dominican tamales stuffed with picadillo. The name  has its origin from the native Taínos.

Puerto Rico
Guanime is a Puerto Rican dish that can be traced back to pre-Columbian times. It consists of corn masa that is stuffed with beans, seafood, nuts, or meat, and then wrapped in corn husks slowly cooked on a grill.

 are prepared in a plain version, without the stuffing, and served with stewed salted cod fish. Since the arrival of Europeans,  have lost their stuffing. Contemporary  are made with corn masa seasoned with coconut milk, lard, broth, and annatto, wrapped in a banana leaf or corn husk.

The several versions of  can be made with green plantains, cassava, and a sweet version made with sweet plantains and cornmeal.

The  is also related to the pastel, a root tamale dating to around the same time as the native Taíno .

Trinidad and Tobago
In Trinidad and Tobago, it is called a pastelle and is popular in many households during the entire Christmas season and New Year celebrations. It is usually made with cornmeal and filled with cooked, seasoned meat (chicken and beef being the most popular), raisins, olives, capers, and other seasonings. The entire pastelle is wrapped in a banana leaf, bound with twine and steamed. When fully cooked, the banana leaf is removed to reveal the brightly yellow-colored dish. It is often indulged as is or along with a meal. The sweet version is called paymee.

Central America

Belize
The tamale is a staple in Belize, where it is also known as dukunu, a sweet corn tamale that gets its name from the Garifuna people. Dukunus are mostly vegetarian and consist of roasted corn kernels blended with coconut milk as a base. Butter, salt, and sugar are also added. Dukunus filled with different meats are also made.

El Salvador 
Tamales are a traditional dish in El Salvador. Tamales are typically eaten during holidays, like Christmas. Tamales have a corn masa base and are wrapped in banana leaves. They contain fillings like chicken, vegetables, and/or beans. Corn tamales, or tamales de elote, are also popular. Bean tamales, or tamales pisques, are also consumed, typically during Holy Week.

Guatemala

Pre-Columbian Guatemala
In the classical times of the Maya of Central America (Guatemala in particular), the great Mayan lords delighted in a baked dough bun during the winter solstice, made of maize mixed with turkey, tepezcuintle (lowland paca) or venison, spices, and chili pepper, among other ingredients.

This meal was later integrated into modern Guatemalan traditions. For example, on Christmas Eve, families prepare black, red, or sweet tamales for family and friends to show gratitude. The tamales are often accompanied with chocolate, yolk bread, and punch, and participate in the Mass of Gallo, at midnight.

In Guatemala, eating tamales at midnight on December 24 and 31 is customary. Guatemalans also eat tamales for holiday celebrations, birthdays, and baptisms, so the tamale is considered an important dish in the culture of Guatemala.

Tamales are sold in stores and private homes (especially on Saturdays). A red light on a home at night is a sign that tamales are for sale at that home.

Varieties

Red tamales owe their name to achiote and tomato and are made with corn dough stuffed with recado rojo, raisins, chili peppers, chicken, beef or pork wrapped in banana leaves.
Cambray tamales contain raisins and almonds. Sweet tamales are filled with sweet . Black tamales are named after the color that chocolate gives them. Chipilin tamales wrapped in corn husks, parrot tamales, and corn tamales among others are also made. Cream tamales and cheese and anise seeds are also mixed with corn tamales.
 is a typical and emblematic dish of Guatemala. It is a variation of the tamale made with corn dough, but a firmer consistency, although lard can be added to the dough to generate a more pleasant taste and consistency. It is wrapped with dried cob leaves (tusa or bender). In some places, it is accompanied by cheese, sauce, or both.
Rice tamales come from the Guatemalan highlands, where the typical corn dough is replaced by a thick dough of annealed rice with water and salt. The preparation of the  does not differ much from the original, since only some regions have the ingredients with which it is made.
 is a tamale particularly from the highlands of Guatemala that uses potato instead of maize for the dough.
This dish is used to accompany a meal and used to scoop food on the plate, or just eaten plain along with the main dish.

Nicaragua

The most popular version of the Tamal in Nicaragua is the nacatamal and sometimes serves as an entire meal in itself. It is a traditional dish with indigenous origins. The name comes from the Nawat language spoken by the Nicarao, who were situated on the Southern Pacific coast of Nicaragua, and translates to "meat tamale". The  is perhaps the most produced within traditional Nicaraguan cuisine and it is an event often reserved for Sundays at mid-morning. It is usually eaten together with fresh bread and coffee. Enjoying  during special occasions and to invite extended family and neighbors to also partake is a common occurrence.

 are much larger in size in comparison to their counterparts, and made up of mostly nixtamalized corn  (a kind of dough traditionally made from a process called ) and lard). This base is ladled onto plantain leaves used for wrapping into large individual portions. The filling usually consists of annatto-seasoned pork meat, rice, slices of potatoes, bell peppers, tomatoes, and onions; olives, spearmint sprigs, and chile , a very small, egg-shaped chile found in Nicaragua. On occasion, prunes, raisins, or capers can be added. The masa and filling are then wrapped in plantain leaves, tied with a string, and made into pillow-shaped bundles – . They are then steamed or pressure-cooked for several hours. The entire process is very labor-intensive, and it often requires preparation over the course of two days; involving the whole family may be needed to complete it.

Varieties
 Are a much simpler version of a tamal in Nicaragua, they are wrapped in a banana leaf, and are eaten with cheese and cooked red beans.
 have a sweet flavor, filled with a mixture of ground beans sweetened with cane sugar or rapadura and are wrapped in banana leaves. They serve as a dessert.
 Is made with tender corn grains that gives it a slightly sweet flavor and wrapped in corn husks. It is generally eaten accompanied by quesillo or cheese, and sour cream.
. A variety of the above stuffed with a mixture of rapadura and grated or ground cheese.
. A Northern Nicaraguan tamal make with chicken or hen meat, wrapped in a banana leaf and tied
 Is a Western Nicaraguan tamal mostly found in León. that consists of masa mixed with mashed green plantain, sugar, honey and salt. It's wrapped in tempisque or fig leaf and cooked.

Mexico

Pre-Columbian Mayas 
In the pre-Columbian era, the Mayas ate tamales and often served them at feasts and festivals. The Classic Maya hieroglyph for tamales has been identified on pots and other objects dating back to the Classic Era (200–1000 CE), although they likely were eaten much earlier. While tortillas are the basis for the contemporary Maya diet, remarkably little evidence exists for tortilla production among the Classic period Maya.  A lack of griddles in the archaeological record suggests that the primary foodstuff of the Mesoamerican diet may have been the tamal, a cooked, vegetal-wrapped mass of maize dough. Tamales are cooked without the use of ceramic technologies and therefore the form of the tamale is thought to predate the tortilla. Similarities between the two maize products can be found in both the ingredients, preparation techniques, and the linguistic ambiguity exhibited by the pan-Mayan term wa referring to a basic, daily consumed maize product that can refer to either tortillas or tamales.

Modern Mexico

In Mexico, tamales begin with a dough made from ground nixtamalized corn (hominy), called masa, or alternatively a rehydrated masa powder, such as Maseca. It is combined with lard or vegetable shortening, along with broth or water, to bring the dough to the consistency of a very thick batter. It is traditional to whisk the lard, and whisk the resulting batter, with the intent of producing the signature soft and fluffy texture. Modern recipes may use baking powder to achieve a similar effect. Chili purees or dried chili powders are also occasionally added to the batter, which in addition to the spice can cause some tamales to appear red in color. Tamales are generally wrapped in corn husks or plantain leaves before being steamed, with the choice of husk depending on the region. They usually have a sweet or savory filling and are usually steamed until firm.

Tamale-making is a ritual that has been part of Mexican life since pre-Hispanic times, when special fillings and forms were designated for each specific festival or life event. Today, tamales are typically filled with meats, cheese, or vegetables, especially chilies. Preparation is complex and time-consuming, and an excellent example of Mexican communal cooking, where this task usually falls to the women. Tamales are a favorite comfort food in Mexico, eaten as both breakfast and dinner, and often accompanied by hot atole or champurrado and arroz con leche (rice porridge, "rice with milk") or maize-based beverages of indigenous origin. Street vendors can be seen serving them from huge, steaming, covered pots or ollas.

Instead of corn husks, banana or plantain leaves are used in tropical parts of the country, such as Oaxaca, Chiapas, Veracruz, and the Yucatán Peninsula. These tamales are rather square in shape, often very large—15 inches (40 cm)—and these larger tamales are commonly known as pibs in the Yucatán Peninsula. Depending on the size,  can feed between 50 and 200 people; they are made during festivals and holidays, for quinceañeras, and on Sundays to be sold at the markets.

South America

Humitas (from Quechua humint'a) is a Native South American dish from pre-Hispanic times, a traditional food from the Andes and it can be found in Bolivia, Chile, Ecuador, Peru, and Northwest Argentina. It consists of fresh choclo (Peruvian corn) pounded to a paste, wrapped in a fresh corn husk, and slowly steamed or boiled in a pot of water. In Bolivia it is known as huminta and in Brazil as pamonha.

Venezuela
Hallaca is a traditional meal from Venezuela that resembles the aspect of a tamal. It consists of corn dough stuffed with a stew of beef, pork, or chicken and other ingredients such as raisins, capers, and olives, fresh onion rings, red and green bell pepper slices. There are also vegetarian options with black beans or tofu. Hallacas are folded in plantain leaves, tied with strings, and boiled. The dish is traditionally served during the Christmas season and has several regional variants in Venezuela. It has been described as a national dish of Venezuela but it can be found also in variants. A characteristic of the hallaca is the delicate corn dough made with consommé or broth and lard colored with annatto.

Peru

Tamales were one of the dishes that the gay, Peruvian chef Juan Jose Cabezudo was famous for serving from his food stand near the Plaza Mayor in Lima.

Philippines and Guam

In the Philippines and Guam, which were governed by Spain as a province of Mexico, different forms of tamale-like foods exist. In the Philippines, they merged with the native leaf-wrapped rice cakes (kakanin) and are made with a dough derived from ground rice and are filled with seasoned chicken or pork with the addition of peanuts and other seasonings such as sugar.  In some places, such as Pampanga, where it is popularly known as bobotu, and Batangas provinces, the tamales are wrapped in banana leaves, but sweet corn varieties from the Visayas region are wrapped in corn husks similar to the sweet corn tamales of the American Southwest and Mexico.  Because of the work involved in the preparation of tamales, they usually only appear during the special holidays or other big celebrations.  Various  recipes have practically disappeared under the pressures of modern life and the ease of fast food.  Several varieties of tamales are also found in the Philippines.

Tamales, tamalis, tamalos, and pasteles are different varieties found throughout the region. Some are sweet, some are savory, and some are sweet and savory. Mostly wrapped in banana leaves and made of rice, either the whole grain or ground and cooked with coconut milk and other seasonings, they are sometimes filled with meat and seafood, or are plain and have no filling. There are certain varieties, such as tamalos, that are made of a sweet corn masa wrapped in a corn husk or leaf. The number of varieties has dwindled through the years so certain types of tamales that were once popular in the Philippines have become lost or are simply memories. The variety found in Guam, known as tamales guiso, is made with corn masa and wrapped in corn husks, and as with the Philippine tamales, are clear evidence of the influence of the galleon trade that occurred between the ports of Manila and Acapulco.

United States

Tamales have been eaten in the United States since at least 1893, when they were featured at the World's Columbian Exposition. In 1894, when tamales were the most popular ethnic food in Los Angeles, XLNT Foods started making them. The company is the oldest continuously operating Mexican food brand in the United States, and one of the oldest companies in Southern California.

A tradition of roving tamale sellers was documented in early 20th-century blues music. They are the subject of the well-known 1937 blues/ragtime song "They're Red Hot" by Robert Johnson.

While Mexican-style and other Latin American-style tamales are featured at ethnic restaurants throughout the United States, some distinctly indigenous styles also are made.

The Choctaw and Chickasaw make a dish called banaha, which can be stuffed or not (plain). Usually, the filling (ranging from none, fried bacon, turkey, deer, nuts, and vegetables such as onions, potatoes, squash, and sweet potatoes) can either be filled or mixed with the masa and steamed in a corn husk.

Cherokee tamales, also known as bean bread or "broadswords", were made with hominy (in the case of the Cherokee, the masa was made from corn boiled in water treated with wood ashes instead of lime) and beans, and wrapped in green corn leaves or large tree leaves and boiled, similar to the meatless pre-Columbian bean and masa tamales still prepared in Chiapas, central Mexico, and Guatemala.

In the Mississippi Delta, African Americans developed a spicy tamale made from cornmeal instead of masa, which is boiled in corn husks. This is sometimes called a "hot tamale".

In northern Louisiana, tamales have been made for several centuries. The Spanish established presidio Los Adaes in 1721 in modern-day Robeline, Louisiana. The descendants of these Spanish settlers from central Mexico were the first tamale makers to arrive in the eastern US.  Zwolle, Louisiana, has a Tamale Fiesta every year in October.

Around the beginning of the 20th century, the name "tamale pie" was given to meat pies and casseroles made with a cornmeal crust and typical tamale fillings arranged in layers. Although characterized as Mexican food, these forms are not popular in Mexican American culture in which the individually wrapped style is preferred.

The Indio International Tamale Festival held every December in Indio, California, has earned two Guinness World Records: the largest tamale festival (154 000 in attendance, December  2002) and the world's largest tamale, over 1 foot (0.3 m) in diameter and 40 feet (12.2 m) in length, created by Chef John Sedlar, since beaten by H. Ayuntamiento de Centro Villahermosa (Mexico) in Villahermosa, Tabasco, Mexico, on 25 November 2018. The current record stands at 50.05 m. The 2006 Guinness book calls the festival "the world's largest cooking and culinary festival".

See also

 Ada (food)
 Lepet
 Botok
 Conkies
 Hallacas
 Humitas
 List of maize dishes
 List of pork dishes
 List of stuffed dishes
 Pamonha
 Pasteles
 Pepes
 Suman (food)
 Kenkey
 Tamale Guy
 Zongzi

References

American cuisine
Ancient dishes
Belizean cuisine
Christmas food
Cuban cuisine
Colombian cuisine
Cuisine of the Southwestern United States
Dominican Republic cuisine
Dumplings
Guamanian cuisine
Guatemalan cuisine
Honduran cuisine
Latin American cuisine
Maize dishes
Mesoamerican cuisine
Mexican cuisine
Philippine cuisine
Pork dishes
Salvadoran cuisine
South American cuisine
Street food
Steamed foods
Stuffed dishes
Street food in Mexico